Galenia secunda (onesided galenia) is a plant species native to South Africa but naturalized in Australia (Western Australia, Victoria, Tasmania and New South Wales), Spain, and the United States (Florida and New Jersey). In Spain and Australia, is considered an invasive weed threatening native vegetation.

Galenia secunda is shrub or perennial herb with grayish-white stems that trail along the ground for as much as 60 cm, forming mats. Leaves are grayish-white, folded inward, up to 2.5 cm long. Flowers are small, white to yellowish, up to 2 mm in diameter, often hidden by the leaves.

References

Aizoaceae
Flora of Florida
Flora of Australia
Flora of South Africa
Flora of New Jersey
Flora of Spain
Taxa named by Otto Wilhelm Sonder
Flora without expected TNC conservation status